Custom, customary, or consuetudinary may refer to:

Traditions, laws, and religion
 Convention (norm), a set of agreed, stipulated or generally accepted rules, norms, standards or criteria, often taking the form of a custom
 Norm (social), a rule that is socially enforced
 Customary law or consuetudinary, laws and regulations established by common practice
 Customary (liturgy) or consuetudinary, a Christian liturgical book describing the adaptation of rites and rules for a particular context
 Custom (Catholic canon law), an unwritten law established by repeated practice
 Customary international law, an aspect of international law involving the principle of custom
 Mores
 Tradition
 Minhag (pl. minhagim), Jewish customs
 ʿUrf (Arabic: العرف), the customs of a given society or culture

Import-export
 Customs, a tariff on imported or exported goods
 Custom house

Modification
 Modding
 Bespoke, anything commissioned to a particular specification
 Custom car
 Custom motorcycle

Brands, titles and proper names
 Custom (guitar), a model of guitar made by Fender
 Custom (musician), stage name for New York-based musician Duane Lavold
 Customs (TV series), an Irish television series that focuses on the daily lives of customs officers
 Kimber Custom, a type of pistol
 Customs (album), a 1989 album by Savage Republic

See also
 Customs officer
 Kustom (disambiguation)